Greslania is a genus of small perennial bamboos in the grass family, endemic to New Caledonia, with 4 accepted species.

Description 
Greslania species have woody culms emerging from short, clumping rhizomes. They generally lack lateral branches, instead growing clumps of erect culms reaching  in height.

Species 
 Greslania circinata Balansa
 Greslania montana Balansa
Greslania multiflora Pilg.
 Greslania rivularis Balansa

References

Bambusoideae genera
Endemic flora of New Caledonia
Bambusoideae
Taxa named by Benjamin Balansa